In the United States, late night television is the block of television programming intended for broadcast after 11:00 p.m. and usually through 2:00 a.m. Eastern and Pacific Time (ET/PT), leading out of prime time; informally, the daypart can include the designated overnight graveyard slot (encompassing programs airing as late as 5:00 a.m. local time). Most notably, the type of programming that has been traditionally showcased in the daypart—most commonly shown after, if not in competition with, local late-evening newscasts—encompasses a particular genre of programming that falls somewhere between a variety show and a talk show.

This article focuses on television programs and programming concepts commonly shown in late night on national broadcast and cable networks and in syndication.

Talk shows

Popular shows within the late night talk show genre include The Tonight Show Starring Jimmy Fallon, The Late Show with Stephen Colbert, The Late Late Show with James Corden, Late Night with Seth Meyers and Jimmy Kimmel Live!. Famous former hosts include Johnny Carson of The Tonight Show Starring Johnny Carson; David Letterman of Late Night with David Letterman and Late Show with David Letterman (as well as the short-lived daytime David Letterman Show); Conan O'Brien of Late Night with Conan O'Brien, The Tonight Show with Conan O'Brien, and Conan; Jay Leno of The Tonight Show with Jay Leno (who has taped more episodes than any other late night host); Craig Ferguson of The Late Late Show with Craig Ferguson; Arsenio Hall of The Arsenio Hall Show; Tom Snyder of Tomorrow, and The Late Late Show; Steve Allen, the father of the late night talk show and founder of Tonight (now known as The Tonight Show); Merv Griffin and Dick Cavett, early competitors with Carson; and Jack Paar, the man who followed Steve Allen as host of The Tonight Show and who is responsible for setting the standards for the genre.

Television networks typically produce two late night shows: one taped in New York City and one in Los Angeles. Most are taped late in the afternoon; exceptions include Jimmy Kimmel Live!, which finishes taping about an hour before it is broadcast, and The Late Show with Stephen Colbert, which airs live after events of major importance. The fact that this limits accurate coverage of the latest 24-hour news cycle is sometimes the source of irony humor or notable delays (for instance, The Death of Michael Jackson, a frequent butt of late night jokes, on the afternoon of June 25, 2009 came after all but Kimmel had taped their shows, and as such, Kimmel was the only one to mention it that night).

Scheduling
Until September 2009 and again since spring 2010, the "Big Three television networks" (NBC, ABC and CBS) have all begun their late night programming at 11:35 p.m. Eastern Time each night; Fox, the fourth major U.S. network, aired only one day of late night programming (Saturday) starting at 11:00 p.m. This is a half-hour to one hour after the end of prime time to allow local stations to air newscasts, and most stations (with a few exceptions) do. ABC, CBS and NBC all begin their late night schedules with comedy and interview-based talk shows, however only CBS and NBC air additional lead-out talk shows beginning in the 12:35 a.m. Eastern Time slot; on ABC, the newsmagazine Nightline serves as the lead-out to Jimmy Kimmel Live!.

For a brief time in Fall 2009, NBC followed a significantly different model starting in September of that year, following severe losses of audience for its scripted dramas. Jay Leno, formerly the host of NBC's long-running The Tonight Show franchise, had moved his show to 10:00 p.m. Eastern Time, ahead of the local newscasts on most stations in a time slot that competes with CBS's and ABC's prime time programming (though Fox affiliates would have cut to post-primetime news or syndicated sitcom reruns by this time). Beginning in September 2009, Leno hosted The Jay Leno Show, which was mostly similar to The Tonight Show with Jay Leno with a few adjustments. This made way for Conan O'Brien (formerly the host of Late Night with Conan O'Brien, another long-running NBC late night franchise) to take over The Tonight Show with Conan O'Brien, while Jimmy Fallon has assumed hosting duties for Late Night with Jimmy Fallon. The remaining late night programs (Poker After Dark and Last Call with Carson Daly) remained as is, and NBC warned its affiliates not to preempt or delay Leno for local news. After affiliates' fears of significantly lower ratings for local news were in fact realized, NBC announced it would indeed cancel its 10:00 p.m. experiment and move Leno back to his traditional start time of 11:35 (originally by moving The Jay Leno Show, before rejoining as host of The Tonight Show outright due to problems over the network's original plan to shift the latter program later by a half-hour to make room for Leno that led O'Brien to negotiate an exit from his Tonight contract).

Of the major networks, NBC, ABC and CBS program the late night slot on weekdays, but only NBC carries first-run entertainment shows in that time period on Saturdays; none of the major networks air first-run late night shows on Sundays. (NBC does offer its affiliates a same-day repeat of its political talk show Meet the Press on Sunday nights—which, like its weeknight rebroadcast of the fourth hour of Today and its Saturday overnight block of lifestyle programs produced by sister company LXTV, are not cleared by the network's owned-and-operated stations.) Fox carried first-run late night programming on weeknights off-and-on from 1986 to 1993 and on Saturdays from 1989 to 2010; however since the cancellation of The Wanda Sykes Show, no longer airs traditional late night programs on any day of the week (a six-week test run of a daily talk show hosted by Craig Kilborn failed to be picked up by the network, and the 90-minute Saturday late night block previously occupied by Sykes and before that by MADtv consisted only of reruns of Fox primetime programming until July 2013, when it added a block of Animation Domination High-Def that was subsequently canceled in 2014 due to sports overruns and remains on the network merely as reruns).

Until the early 1990s, syndicated late night talk shows were fairly common, due to NBC having the only network shows in that slot at the time. The Arsenio Hall Show, which originally ran from 1988 to 1994, was able to pick from CBS, ABC or Fox affiliates (the affiliate makeup of the short-lived revival that aired from 2013 to 2014 consisted of Fox, CW and MyNetworkTV stations). When Late Show with David Letterman and The Chevy Chase Show debuted in 1993, Hall lost a large number of affiliates and ended up leaving the air at the end of the season. There has not been a successful syndicated late night talk show since that time.

Typical format
These shows often follow the same canonical format:
 a stand-up comedy segment, called the monologue in which the host makes news satire;
 several sketch comedy, sketches, or other comedy bits;
 interviews with one or two celebrity guests;
 a music guest or stand-up comedy.

There have been deviations from this format. A notable example is Last Call with Carson Daly, which (except for a two-year period from 2007 to 2009) has traditionally avoided monologues and comedy bits, although it originally utilized most major elements of the traditional late-night talk format; in 2009, the show deviated even further from the traditional format by taping all hosted and interview segments on-location (the former of which serve merely as wraparounds as Daly does not interview the guests) and shooting all interviews and musical performances in the style of a documentary.

Late night talk shows often incorporate segments of political satire, including several programs that are formatted around political and pop culture-focused topical humor instead of featuring interviews and music and stand-up comedy performances. Notable examples include The Daily Show (1999–present), The Colbert Report (2005–2014), Last Week Tonight with John Oliver (2014–present), Gutfeld! (2015–present), and Full Frontal with Samantha Bee (2016–present). The Daily Show is a satire of evening news programs (having transitioned from its initial pop culture-focused format during its first three years under original host Craig Kilborn to a more political focus subsequent to Jon Stewart replacing Kilborn in 1999), and inspired similar satirical news programs such as The Colbert Report, a spin-off that parodied political talk shows (with host Stephen Colbert's in-show persona mocking conservative talk show hosts), and Last Week Tonight with John Oliver, which offers a satirical "week-in-review" commentary as well as a seriocomic topical "main story" of interest.

Fox News' Red Eye and both of Bill Maher's late-night discussion shows, Politicially Incorrect and Real Time, use a round table format that incorporates a mix of news discussion and satire, although roundtable is only used in the descriptive sense; in the case of Red Eye, some guests appear on the program via satellite, while a regular on the show appears from another part of the Fox News studios. (By contrast, Gutfeld!, hosted by former Red Eye moderator Greg Gutfeld and converted from a Saturday-only to a weeknightly program in March 2021, hews somewhat closer to a traditional late-night talk format albeit while incorporating conservative commentary.)

House bands
Most shows in this genre have an house band that plays musical interludes. Popular late night band leaders include Paul Shaffer, leader of World's Most Dangerous Band on Late Night and the Late Show with David Letterman, where it was known as the CBS Orchestra; Max Weinberg, leader of The Max Weinberg 7 on Late Night and The Tonight Show Band on The Tonight Show with Conan O'Brien; Cleto and the Cletones on Jimmy Kimmel Live!; Kevin Eubanks, leader of The Tonight Show Band, and The Roots, an eclectic hip-hop band turned host-band of Late Night with Jimmy Fallon (and later The Tonight Show Starring Jimmy Fallon), and Jon Batiste and Stay Human, the house band for the Late Show with Stephen Colbert.

Usually the band leader is a major part of the show, and the band leader and host often exchange playful banter during the monologue and comedy segments; the band leader has thus taken over the part of being the host's sidekick, which in the past was played by an announcer or designated co-host (such as Ed McMahon and Andy Richter). Of the current late night talk show band leaders who play this role, Paul Shaffer is well known for being a straight man to David Letterman. On The Merv Griffin Show, Mort Lindsey was the official bandleader, but trumpeter (and established comic and voice actor) Jack Sheldon shared most of the comic material and banter with host Merv Griffin. However, on The Tonight Show with Conan O'Brien, Max Weinberg rarely spoke during the show, and his interactions with O'Brien were often short and awkward – a running gag on the show (Richter, now the announcer, was O'Brien's primary sidekick on The Tonight Show and carried on in that role on Conan, whereas new band leader Jimmy Vivino has barely any interaction with O'Brien), and Kevin Eubanks was often the butt of Leno's jokes, particularly regarding drug-related stories. Most notably The Late Late Show with Craig Ferguson did not have a house band, and Ferguson often used that fact as a running gag in his show; Ferguson used a robot named Geoff Peterson as his sidekick (The Late Late Show had never had a house band with hosts Tom Snyder, Craig Kilborn, and Craig Ferguson, but with James Corden's assumption of hosting duties, the program features a house band led by Reggie Watts).

Late-night talk shows are the last television format to still use house bands. They were common during the Golden Age of Radio on most variety shows and sitcoms but largely faded away in most formats other than variety and late-night in the 1950s; variety shows as a standalone format themselves fell out of favor in the 1970s.

Announcers
Often, the show's announcer is also a major part of the show. Famous announcers include Gene Rayburn and Hugh Downs (both from the early years of The Tonight Show); Ed McMahon from The Tonight Show Starring Johnny Carson; Edd Hall and John Melendez from The Tonight Show with Jay Leno; Bill Wendell and Alan Kalter from Late Show with David Letterman; Dicky Barrett from Jimmy Kimmel Live!; Steve Higgins from the Jimmy Fallon eras of Late Night and The Tonight Show; Andy Richter from The Tonight Show with Conan O'Brien and Conan; and Don Pardo from Saturday Night Live. These announcers often have significant career accomplishments outside of their particular shows. Before Jen Spyra on the Late Show with Stephen Colbert, there were no female late night announcers.

Other formats

Network variety and entertainment programming
Other late night programs on broadcast and cable television break the standard format. In October 1975, after the network decided to discontinue its Saturday reruns of The Tonight Show Starring Johnny Carson per Carson's request to instead air reruns periodically during the week to decrease his production workload, NBC replaced the weekend Tonight reruns with a new comedy-variety series, NBC's Saturday Night (permanently retitled Saturday Night Live beginning with its third season); the 90-minute program, which continues to air  and has remained a staple of NBC's Saturday lineup even after the network (and its broadcast competitors) ceased producing original scripted prime time programming on that night in the mid-2000s, primarily features sketches performed by a repertory cast of comedians (referred to in its early seasons as the "Not Ready for Prime Time Players") and a celebrity guest host (who also performs a monologue following the opening sketch and title sequence) as well as live performances from a featured musical act. The program inspired other sketch comedy-foused variety series, including a handful that aired in late night, such as Fridays (developed in 1980 as ABC's answer to SNL with a nearly identical format) and MADtv (which served as a partial direct competitor to SNL throughout its initial 1995–2010 run and was Fox's longest-running late night program to date).

During the 1970s and 1980s, CBS filled its late-night period with dramatic programming, primarily under the CBS Late Movie banner. Although the time slot did, indeed, feature movies, it also featured a mixture of previously broadcast dramas dating back to the 1960s (i.e. The Avengers, The Prisoner, Kojak) as well as first-run series such as the British imports Return of the Saint and The New Avengers. The CBS Late Movie strand was later restructured as CBS Late Night in September 1985 (later revived in October 1989 following the cancellation of The Pat Sajak Show, which had replaced the block eight months earlier), featuring reruns of CBS series, imported and first-run programs; the block was supplanted in March 1991 by Crimetime After Primetime, a rotating collection of original crime drama series (including several Canadian-originated productions) that lasted until the Late Show with David Letterman premiered in 1993.

Networks have also run music programs in the time period, including NBC's The Midnight Special (which featured contemporary music performances conducted on a soundstage) and Friday Night Videos (which originally was formatted as a music video showcase, before evolving in 1991 into a variety program featuring live music performances, celebrity interviews, stand-up comedy performances, movie reviews, viewer polls and comedy sketches, and finally to an exclusive stand-up comedy showcase format in 2000), and ABC's In Concert (which featured pre-recorded concert performances from various established and up-and-coming music acts).

News
ABC's Nightline has long been an exception to the networks' "comedy/variety" formula. Debuting in 1980 (although it traces its roots to a series of half-hour special reports on the Iran hostage crisis that began in 1979), Nightline is a nightly half-hour newsmagazine that originally aired immediately after local newscasts on ABC's owned-and-operated stations and affiliates, before being pushed to a later slot in January 2013, when it switched timeslots with Jimmy Kimmel Live.

The three major networks have also ventured into overnight newscasts that air after the traditional late night schedules (airing as cycling hour-long blocks that air as early as 2:00 a.m. Eastern Time by default, although stations typically preempt portions of these programs to air locally produced and acquired programming after the network late night lineups). NBC premiered the first overnight network news effort in July 1982 with NBC News Overnight, an hour-long program that mixed hard news features with incisive topical commentary and light-hearted feature stories; it aired for 18 months until high production costs and limited ad revenue led to the show's discontinuance in December 1983. CBS followed in October 1982 with CBS News Nightwatch, which maintained a hybrid traditional newscast and interview/debate format (and, for its first two years, allowed affiliates to include local news updates during the program).

More conventional overnight network newscasts debuted in the early 1990s to fill airtime on major network affiliates that had adopted or were planning to adopt 24-hour program schedules (which many independent stations had begun to adopt since the prior decade) in an effort to compete with increased late-night offerings on cable television and more specifically to compete with CNN, which had been lauded for its round-the-clock coverage of the Gulf War in early 1991. During the 1991–92 television season, the "Big Three" networks each premiered their own overnight newscasts, produced as rolling 60- to 90-minute-long blocks intended for affiliates to air in repeated fashion until the start of the next station-designated broadcast day: NBC Nightside (debuted in November 1991, and produced by the Charlotte-based NBC News Channel affiliate video service), ABC's World News Now (debuted in January 1992 as a more conventional newscast, which soon evolved into a more laid-back format, mixing serious news with features and some ad-libbed and intentional humor), and CBS's Up to the Minute (debuted in March 1992 as a replacement for Nightwatch, consisting of a mix of hard news, weather and sports segments as well as feature reports originally featured on the CBS Evening News and CBS Sunday Morning). , World News Now is the only overnight news effort that debuted in 1991–92 which continues to air. Nightside was discontinued in September 1998, in favor of the overnight entertainment block "NBC All Night" (initially offering week-delayed rebroadcasts of The Tonight Show and Late Night weeknights, same-day rebroadcasts of Meet the Press on Sundays, and weekly 90-minute classic episodes of Saturday Night Live); NBC began offering its early-morning news program Early Today as a de facto overnight newscast in September 2017, after it dropped late-night rebroadcasts of CNBC's Mad Money in favor an earlier live broadcast of the former to accommodate affiliates that had expanded their local morning newscasts into the 4:00 a.m. hour during the 2010s. CBS replaced Up to the Minute in September 2015 with CBS Overnight News, featuring a mix of segments repurposed from the previous day's edition of the CBS Evening News/CBS Weekend News, updated news summaries and additional content.

Local and syndicated programming
The "midnight movie" format is another popular late night format, found particularly among local stations. Off Beat Cinema (originated on WKBW-TV in Buffalo, New York, before moving to WBBZ-TV and now airing nationally on the Retro Television Network), Big Chuck and Lil' John (a now-discontinued program on WJW in Cleveland), Svengoolie (originating on WFLD in Chicago, before moving to WCIU-TV; and later airing nationally on MeTV), the Creature Double Feature, and Elvira's Movie Macabre are some of the better-known late night hosted movie series.

Certain syndicated tabloid talk shows, such as The Jerry Springer Show, have also aired in late night (either in their primary or secondary daily runs) because of their adult content. However, syndicated talk shows intended for broadcast in daytime slots that air in late night typically are placed there involuntarily due to low ratings in their original daytime slots, no room on their station's schedule to fit them in an appropriate timeslot, or to fill time that would otherwise be taken up by infomercials or sitcom reruns. Incidentally, the first program to follow the format known today as the "daytime talk show" aired in late night; Les Crane's pioneering interview show aired on ABC in late night for six months from 1964 to 1965.

A brief influx of game shows began to fill the late night airwaves in the mid-to-late-1980s, such as Tom Kennedy's nighttime Price Is Right, The $1,000,000 Chance of a Lifetime, the syndicated version of Sale of the Century, the Bill Rafferty-hosted version of Card Sharks, and High Rollers. These shows were intended for prime time access slots but by that time, Wheel of Fortune and Jeopardy! had already cornered that market, and virtually all of those game shows were cancelled after one season.

During the 1990s and early 2000s, the dating game show also filled late night slots in syndication. Two of the earliest successes were Love Connection and Studs. The dating game shows that debuted from 1998 onward (such as Blind Date, The 5th Wheel and ElimiDate) were known for often pushing the boundaries of sexually suggestive content on broadcast television, and therefore usually aired in late night on nearly all stations to which they were syndicated, with very few exceptions. Though the genre largely died off from syndication in 2006 (partly due to effects from tighter content restrictions enforced by syndicators after the Super Bowl XXXVIII halftime show controversy), it saw a resurgence in 2011 with the debut of Excused and Who Wants to Date a Comedian?, followed by the 2012 sale of the cable game show Baggage into syndication; this resurgence was short-lived, as all three shows left syndication in 2013.

Cable television

Networks and programming blocks
Two prominent nighttime-only cable and satellite channels currently operate in the United States: Nick at Nite, a collection of primarily reruns of older and some recent network sitcoms—as well as occasional prime time movie presentations—that airs over the channel space of Nickelodeon normally between 9:00 p.m. and 6:30 a.m. Eastern Time (Nick at Nite’s start time is subtracted by 30 minutes or one hour on Saturdays depending on the week, and its end time is subtracted by one hour on weekends to accommodate regularly-scheduled extensions of Nickelodeon’s schedule, such as its Saturday block of first-run live-action series aimed at pre-teens and young teenagers, on those nights), and Adult Swim, a block of animated and a limited amount of live-action programming targeted toward older teenagers and young adults that shares space on the channel slot of Cartoon Network nightly from 8:00 p.m. to 6:00 a.m. Eastern Time. (In addition to reruns of sitcoms and—occasionally until the late 1990s—half-hour dramas, Nick at Nite also offered a limited amount of first-run original programming, mainly between 2005 and 2018.)

As the number of cable channels expanded during the 1980s and 1990s, up until late into the latter decade, it was fairly common for two or more standalone networks to share space on a single channel (usually with one service occupying the daytime hours and the other occupying nighttime slots), a method used in particular by cable systems to account for limitations to headend infrastructures of the time period, which afforded a relatively limited number of channels that could be allocated to a single system’s lineup (an issue rectified by systematic headend upgrades that allowed for the implementation of digital cable service by the late 1990s). In such cases, cable system operators would typically switch between continuously-running channel feeds between dayparts.

In its first six years of operation, Nickelodeon leased transponder airtime to offer The Movie Channel (from April 1979 to January 1980, as a part-time scrambled signal accessible only to subscribers of the premium service), the Alpha Repertory Television Service (ARTS) and its successor A&E (from April 1981 to February 1984 as ARTS, and until December 1984 as A&E) over its channel space during the network’s nighttime off-hours, each of which (with the exception of ARTS, which merged with film- and arts-oriented premium-turned-basic service The Entertainment Channel in February 1984 to form A&E) would eventually obtain full-time standalone satellite transponders to transmit 24 hours a day.

Noggin, a channel co-founded by Nickelodeon and Sesame Workshop, launched in 1999 with a nighttime "retro" block. The block mainly aired classic shows from Sesame Workshop's library. In 2002, the network revamped its schedule, discarding the retro block and extending its preschool and tween/teen blocks to last for 12 hours each day. The latter block, now retitled "The N," ran nightly from 6 p.m. to 6 a.m. EST. Before The N block's introduction, Noggin aired tween shows as part of its daytime lineup, such as A Walk in Your Shoes, Sponk!, and Big Kids. From 2002 onward, these older-targeting shows only aired during The N.

In the 2010s, Nickelodeon's sister channels Nick Jr. and TeenNick offered their own targeted nighttime blocks. In July 2011, TeenNick launched "NickRewind" (originally "The ‘90s Are All That"), featuring reruns of Nickelodeon programs from the 1990s and aimed at young adults who watched these programs during that decade as children. In October 2012, Nick Jr. launched a female-oriented block, "NickMom", which generated controversy for running content inappropriate for Nick Jr.'s main target audience in the late-afternoon/early-evening in areas west of the Mountain Time Zone (as Nick Jr. transmitted a single feed operating on an Eastern Time schedule) and was discontinued in September 2015.

From its launch in April 1983 until September 2002, Disney Channel programmed its late-night schedule to cater to adult audiences; as a premium service, the channel’s nighttime schedule offered a mix of recent and classic films of varying appeal to family audiences, historical, music and educational documentaries, and music specials aimed at adults known (branded as "Disney Nighttime" from 1986 to 1995); in September 1997, “Vault Disney” premiered as a Sunday-only nighttime block encompassing older Disney-produced series and specials (generally those originally produced for network television) and selected older feature films from the studio that had been shifted off its daytime and prime time lineup). “Vault Disney” would expand into a nightly block by late 1998, before being discontinued in September 2002 as part of a broader rebranding of the network to cater more to children and teenagers. (Since then, Disney Channel's late-night programming has featured reruns of the network's preteen-skewing original series and occasional airing of its original made-for-TV films; as such, Disney Channel is the largest American family-oriented cable network that does not target its nighttime programming at an older audience.) From 2004 until the channel was replaced by Disney XD in February 2009, now-defunct spin-off network Toon Disney ran “Jetix”, a block of action-oriented live-action and animated series targeted at older children in the evening and early overnight slot. Since its 2012 launch, the Disney Junior linear channel features some archival programming from the 1990s during the overnight hours.

Other networks that have offered nighttime-only timeshare channel feeds or program blocks included USA Network, which carried Black Entertainment Television (BET) as a two-hour-long nightly block from January 1980 to January 1983, and the Financial News Network, which shared channel space with sports-oriented network Score from April 1985 to May 1991. (Score aired exclusively during the nighttime hours until September 1988, before being relegated to weekend afternoons and evenings when FNN began offering financial news and talk programs in prime time Monday–Friday; "FNN-SCORE", as it was known collectively, was bought out by NBC Inc. and Cablevision, and integrated with the competing CNBC in 1991.)

Programming formats
Late night talk shows, once exclusive to network television, have begun to be included on cable channels as well in recent years due in part to the success of Comedy Central's The Daily Show with Jon Stewart; other late night cable talk shows such as Conan, @midnight, The Colbert Report and Chelsea Lately have also proven successful; however, late night talk/variety programs on cable have a slight advantage over their broadcast counterparts as most of them typically air at 11:00 p.m. Eastern Time, at the same time that most local broadcast stations air their late evening newscasts and 35 minutes before the major networks begin their late night network programming. These shows also have the advantage of not being subject to Federal Communications Commission guidelines, though internal network standards (in the case of advertiser-supported cable channels) generally result in these shows not being much more ribald than their network counterparts.

Pay television often air softcore pornography during the late night hours (in addition to mainstream programs), containing simulated sexual intercourse and nudity that would likely not be allowed to air during the daytime hours; Cinemax is strongly associated with showing programs of that genre, despite the fact that softcore content encompasses only a few hours of its daily schedule; although most of the Showtime Networks (including Showtime and The Movie Channel) and HBO's multiplex channel HBO Zone have also carried (either presently or in the past) adult films or series. There are 24-hour pay services dedicated to pornographic content that also exist, operating similarly to the pay-per-view model (such as Playboy TV and the more hardcore pornography Spice Networks), which television providers typically sell as nighttime-only packages. Premium channels also run older, lower-profile or obscure feature films (that either received home video, DVD or theatrical release, and often featuring a release lag of up to 30 years) during the overnight hours; these are sometimes interspersed with more recent films, specials and reruns of original series. Some pay services embraced the rise of videocassette recorder in the 1980s and 1990s by promoting the use of recording overnight films for later viewing; The Movie Channel was one such adopter, as from 1986 to 2004, it carried a daily (later weekly) block called "VCR Theater" (later renamed "VCR Overnight" in 1988 and "TMC Overnight" in 1997).

Most American cable channels often air either blocks of infomercial or timeshift channel of prime time programming during late night time periods (the use of replays is most commonly used by cable news channels), while only a handful of basic cable channels (such as TNT, Nickelodeon/Nick at Nite and ESPN) maintain a round-the-clock schedule incorporating entertainment programming during the overnight hours.

See also
List of late-night American network TV programs

References

 

de:Late-Night-Show
es:Late show
zh: